Batalha is a municipality located in the western half of the Brazilian state of Alagoas. Its population is 18,338 (2020) and its area is 321 km².

References

Municipalities in Alagoas